The Province of Seville is a province of southern Spain, in the western part of the autonomous community of Andalusia. It borders the provinces of Málaga, Cádiz in the south, Huelva in the west, Badajoz in the north and Córdoba in the east. Seville is the province's as well as the Andalusian autonomous community's capital.

Overview
Located on the southern bank of the Guadalquivir river, the city of Seville is the largest one in Andalusia. The former province of Andalusia was divided by the Moors into four separate kingdoms—Seville, Cordova, Jaen and Granada. Seville has the highest GDP among the provinces of Andalusia . The Provinces of Málaga (€28,506 million) and Cadiz (€22,574 million) are 2nd and 3rd respectively. The Port of Seville is of great economic importance to the province.

The area of the province is 14,042 km2. Its population is 1,914,958 (2010), of whom 40% live in the capital, Seville, and its population density is 125.25/km2. It contains 105 municipalities. The province shares the Parque Nacional de Doñana with Huelva province. It also has the Sierra Norte de Sevilla Natural Park. The 177,484 hectares park is Andalusia's largest protected area. The Guadalquivir crosses the province from east to west. Guadiana, Pinta and Xenil are other important rivers. The northern part of the province is mostly mountainous. Seville has a warm Mediterranean climate with an annual average temperature of 18.5 °C. Winters are generally mild while summers are hot. The maximum temperatures in summer often surpass 40 °C. The locality of Écija is popularly known as the “Frying Pan of Andalusia” for its torrid summers. Écija is known for its high value of corn production. The province of Seville generates 1.92% of the Spanish hotel movement. In terms of tourism, the city of Seville is one of the leading cities in Andalusia, situated behind Barcelona and Madrid on a national level. In 208 B.C. the whole population of an outpost in the present town of Estepa burnt their houses and committed suicide before Romans attacked it. The capital city Seville is the world's most dense one in terms of Baroque churches. The Socialist Workers Party won the elections in the province from 1982 to 2000. In comparison to other Spanish provinces, Seville is underdeveloped.

Population development
The historical population is given in the following chart:

Notes and references

See also 
 List of municipalities in Seville

External links